NotTheNameWeWanted (formerly known as NotGTAV) is a casual video game developed and published by NotGames. Parodying Grand Theft Auto V in a Snake manner, all profits gained from sales of the game are donated to the Peer Productions charity. The game was released for Microsoft Windows, iOS and Android in 2014, while ports for OS X and Linux followed in 2015.

Gameplay 
NotGames describes NotTheNameWeWanted as a "ruthless Snake-like parody" of Rockstar Games' 2013 hit title, Grand Theft Auto V, despite not sharing any aspects with the game; NotGTAV uses a top-down view model, in contrast to Grand Theft Auto V third-person view, is set in the United Kingdom, rather than the United States, and employs hand-drawn 2D sprites, rather than a fully 3D environment.

Release 
NotGTAV was initially released for Microsoft Windows on 4 April 2014. On 2 July 2015, after a successful Steam Greenlight campaign, NotGames released NotGTAV onto Steam, alongside ports for OS X and Linux, however, the game disappeared again just a week later after, due to Valve allegedly receiving a DMCA takedown notice from Rockstar Games. The game was restored to Steam within 24 hours, after the notice was being treated as a false complainant.

As of 21 April 2018, the game was rebranded to NotTheNameWeWanted.

References

External links 
 

2015 video games
Android (operating system) games
Casual games
Fangames
Grand Theft Auto
IOS games
Indie video games
Linux games
MacOS games
Parody video games
Snake video games
Top-down video games
Video games developed in the United Kingdom
Video games set in the United Kingdom
Windows games